Government Center station may refer to:
Government Center station (GRTC), a BRT stop in Richmond, Virginia, United States
Government Center station (MBTA), a subway station in Boston, Massachusetts, United States
Government Center station (Miami), an intermodal transit station in Miami, Florida, United States
Government Centre station, a light rail station in Edmonton, Alberta, Canada